The Ford Transit Custom is a mid-sized, front wheel drive van produced by Ford Europe since 2012. It is the smaller version of the Ford Transit Mk.8.  As with the rest of the Transit lineup, the more luxurious passenger versions were branded Tourneo Custom.



First generation

The Ford Transit Custom was unveiled at the 2012 Commercial Vehicle Show at the National Exhibition Centre in Birmingham, England. Currently, the Transit Custom is not sold in the United States and Canada, but it is sold in Mexico. It was not sold in China until 2016. An updated version with mild styling changes and a new engine family was introduced in 2017.

Powertrains
It was succeeded in 2017 by a 2.0-litre EcoBlue turbodiesel that was compliant with Euro 6 emissions standards and offered comparable output levels.

An optional mild hybrid system was introduced to the EcoBlue engines in 2019. A belt-driven starter/generator replaces the alternator, which is connected to a 48 V, 10 A-hr lithium-ion battery.

Also in 2019, Ford introduced a plug-in hybrid electric vehicle (PHEV) version of the Tourneo, which uses Ford's 1-litre EcoBoost petrol engine and an electric traction motor with a 13,6 kWh battery. The PHEV is a series hybrid where the petrol engine acts as a range extender, as the front wheels of the car are driven by the electric engine. It can go  on electricity, but up to  using the petrol engine. Fuel consumption is reported to be . This version will be available in the second half of 2019.

Models

Transit Custom Nugget 
The Ford Transit Custom Nugget is a small van designed as a camper (aka campervan) that is sold by Ford and converted by Westfalia. It has various features of overnight camping, such as a sink, stove, and foldout beds. The "Nugget" was launched in select European markets in the spring of 2019.

Swift Monza 
The Swift Monza is a campervan conversion produced by Swift Leisure and based on the Tourneo version of the Transit Custom. It is available with the 2.0 EcoBlue 128PS turbodiesel engine. It is aimed at young families

Markets

Vietnam
The Transit Custom was released in Vietnam on 12 September 2019 until June 2021 as the Tourneo. Assembled at Ford Vietnam manufacturing facility, it is offered in Trend and Titanium (7 seater, SWB) variants with 2.0 L EcoBoost inline-4 petrol engine (rated at 203 horsepower and 300 Nm) with 6-speed automatic transmission as the single powertrain option.

China
In February 2023, the Jiangling Ford joint venture launched a facelifted version of the outgoing first generation for the Chinese market.

Gallery

Second generation

The second generation Transit Custom was unveiled in March 2021, with production to commence at Ford Otosan in 2023. The forthcoming (in 2024) Volkswagen Transporter (T7) will be built as a sibling of the second generation Transit Custom.

On November 22, 2022, the passenger version, the Tourneo Custom, was revealed. Like the panel van, the MPV will be available in electric, plug-in hybrid and diesel versions, as well as the Active crossover variant.

E-Transit Custom 
The E-Transit Custom is a battery-electric panel van variant announced in March 2021 alongside the second-generation Transit Custom and given its final name in May 2022. Key specifications include an estimated range of  using the WLTP driving cycle. Production of the E-Transit Custom is expected to begin in the second half of 2023 at Ford Otosan. The all-electric E-Transit Custom adds another drivetrain option to both the VW T7 Transporter and the Ford Transit Custom, which are expected to continue offering mild hybrid, plug-in hybrid, and diesel options.

The 400 V traction battery of the E-Transit Custom uses the same pouch cells as the Ford F-150 Lightning, with a total useable capacity of 74 kW-hr. Charging at rates of up to 125 kW (DC) or 11 kW (AC) are possible.

The van will be offered with either short or long wheelbase, and low or high roof.

Awards and recognition 
 'Why the Ford Transit Custom is the Best Choice for a Campervan in 2021'
 'International Van of the Year award - 2013'
 'What Van - Medium van of the year award 2019'
 'Honest John - Most popular medium van award 2018'

References

External links

 

Transit Custom
Vans
Front-wheel-drive vehicles
Minivans
Minibuses
Vehicles introduced in 2012